The University of Houston–Victoria (UHV) is a public university in Victoria, Texas.  It is part of the University of Houston System.  Its campus spans  in Victoria with a satellite location at UHV Katy.  Founded in 1971, UHV has an enrollment of over 4,300 students.

History
The University of Houston–Victoria began as an effort in the late 1960s by the local community to bring a higher learning institution to Victoria. In 1971, the Coordinating Board of Texas College and University System created an off-campus center of the University of Houston known as the University of Houston Victoria Center. One hundred students enrolled at the center in its inaugural semester of spring 1973.

In April 1983, the Texas legislature passed Senate Bill 235, which granted the institution permanent degree-granting status in the state of Texas.

UHV started its athletics program during the 2007–2008 school year with the Jaguars baseball and softball team. Since then, the teams have competed in the National Association of Intercollegiate Athletics. Soccer and golf programs for both men and women began in fall 2010.

In October 2008, the UH System Board of Regents adopted a resolution authorizing UHV to seek enabling state legislation to add freshmen and sophomores. In the 81st Texas legislative session, Texas State Representative Geanie Morrison of Victoria introduced House Bill 1056, which would allow UHV to expand, and Texas State Senator Glenn Hegar introduced an identical bill, Senate Bill 567. Texas Governor Rick Perry signed HB 1056 into law on June 19, 2009. The Southern Association of Colleges and Schools approved UHV to admit underclassmen and offer lower-division courses on November 17, 2009, and UHV also received its first freshman application the same day. UHV’s first freshmen and sophomores started taking classes in fall 2010, and the university’s first residence hall, Jaguar Hall, opened on the Victoria campus.

Institutional structure
The University of Houston–Victoria (UHV) is one of four separate and distinct institutions in the University of Houston System.  The institution is separately accredited, offers its own academic programs and confers its own degrees, and has its own administration.  UHV is a stand-alone university; it is not a branch campus of the University of Houston (UH).  Although UHV and UH are both component institutions of the University of Houston System, they are separate  universities.

The organization and control of the University of Houston–Victoria is vested in the Board of Regents of the University of Houston System.  The Board has all the rights, powers, and duties that it has with respect to the organization and control of other institutions in the System; however, UHV is maintained as a separate and distinct institution.

Administration
The president is the chief executive officer of the University of Houston–Victoria, and the position reports to the chancellor of the University of Houston System. The president is appointed by the chancellor and confirmed by the Board of Regents of the University of Houston System. Since April 21, 2015, Dr. Vic Morgan has served as the interim president.

 Reginald Taylor, 1972–1978
 Robert C. Maxson, 1978–1982
 Martha K. Piper, 1982–1986
 Glenn A. Goerke, 1986–1991
 Don N. Smith (interim), 1991–1992
 Lesta Van Der Wert Turchen, 1992–1995
 Karen S. Haynes, 1995–2004
 Don N. Smith (interim), 2004
 Tim Hudson, 2004–2010
 Don N. Smith (interim), 2010-2011
 Philip D. Castille, 2011–2014
 Raymond V. Morgan, Jr., 2014–2018
 Robert (Bob) K. Glenn, 2018–present

Academics

The University of Houston–Victoria (UHV) is separately accredited, offers its own academic programs, and confers its own degrees. UHV is a stand-alone university; it is not a branch campus of the University of Houston (UH). Although UHV and UH are both component institutions of the University of Houston System, they are separate  universities.

While previously an upper-division and graduate school only, UHV expanded in fall 2010 to admit freshmen and sophomores.  UHV consists of four academic colleges: the School of Arts & Sciences, the School of Business Administration, the School of Education & Human Development, and the School of Nursing. Each school offers both undergraduate degrees and  master’s degrees.

Schools

School of Arts & Sciences
The School of Arts & Sciences offers flexible course scheduling through online classes and off-site courses, in addition to the traditional on-campus classes. The School of Arts & Sciences offers a range of programs in the divisions of Humanities; Science, Technology and Mathematics; and Social & Behavioral Sciences. It is home to the literary institutions American Book Review, Fiction Collective Two, symplokē and Cuneiform Press. It also houses the Society for Critical Exchange, and Centro Victoria.

School of Business Administration
The University of Houston–Victoria's School of Business offers degree programs face-to-face or 100% online.

School of Education & Human Development
The School of Education, Health Professions, and Human Development offers both undergraduate and graduate degrees. The undergraduate degree is for those seeking elementary, middle and secondary teaching careers or a career in health studies as a public health educator.

Faculty
Currently, the university has an 18-to-1 ratio and an average class size of 20 students. Instructors come from Canada, China, Colombia, Cuba, Belarus, India, Iran, Jordan, Kenya, Korea, Mexico, Russia, Taiwan and Thailand.

Honor societies with UHV chapters include Phi Kappa Phi, Gamma Beta Phi, Chi Sigma Iota, Psi Chi and Kappa Delta Pi.

Degree in Three
UHV was the first Texas public university to offer an accelerated program where students can earn a complete, 120-credit-hour bachelor's degree in just three years. Degree in Three, or Dn3, lets students earn a degree in communication, criminal justice, English, history or psychology.

Campus

The campus of UHV is located in Victoria, which is part of the Texas Coastal Bend region. It is approximately 30 miles (48 km) from the Gulf of Mexico. The university is nearly equidistant by about 125 miles (201 km) from the cities of Houston, San Antonio and Austin. The Victoria campus consists of about 20 acres (81,000 m2) of land.

The Victoria campus shares some of its facilities with Victoria College. This includes a bookstore/student center, a three-story library with more than 185,000 items in their collection and a fitness center that includes a gym and weight room.

Katy Campus
For years, the University of Houston - Victoria offered classes in Cinco Ranch and the Department of Business and Education in the facilities of Houston Community College - Katy Campus. Eventually a whole floor was used by the university in a different shared building (not HCC), north of I-10 and off Grand Parkway US 99. The University of Houston–Victoria opened the Katy campus in University Park, in a new building.

Student life
Jaguar Village consists of three residence halls: Jaguar Hall, Jaguar Suites and Jaguar Court.

Jaguar Hall also has an on-site dining room and is located a short, 10-minute walk to the UHV campus.

The university opened its second residential hall, Jaguar Court and Jaguar Suites opened in fall 2013 and is the UHV's third residential hall.

Don and Mona Smith Hall is the newest student housing project and will be adjacent to the Student Commons. The $22.8 million, 81,353 square foot building will be a three-story facility which will include 280 beds for sophomores and upper-level students, a large classroom, programming space, reception area, laundry, and common kitchens on every floor.

The Science, Technology, Engineering, Mathematics (STEM) building will be adjacent to the University Center building and directly across from the University North building.  The $28 million, 56,464 square foot building will include lab space for biology, physics, chemistry, organic chemistry, computer science, microbiology, computer engineering and mathematics; classrooms, faculty and staff offices, immersive 180 degree screen lab, seminar room, and gathering spaces.  The addition of this building allows new degree offerings in educational technology, computer engineering, economics concentration in its BBA, petroleum technology concentration, as well as the ability to add additional programs in the future.

Victoria Town Plaza Mall consists of approximately 10 acres and 124,000 square feet.  The proposed site will house 50% of the library collection, Small Business Development Center, Regional Economic Development Center, climate controlled space for records retention and storage,  and flex space for academic programs while academic buildings are being designed and constructed.  The land will allow for additional parking for students with an added shuttle bus stop.

The University Commons is a $29.5 million project located directly across from the University Center building. The Student Center area will include a bookstore, food court, lounge and game room space, staff office space, and Student Government space, and other amenities. The Learning Commons will include library services, a variety of technologies, private and group study spaces, comfortable and moveable furniture, writing assistance and tutoring.

Athletics

The Houston–Victoria (UHV) athletic teams are called the Jaguars. UHV is one of two University of Houston System member schools with a varsity athletic program. The university is a member of the National Association of Intercollegiate Athletics (NAIA), primarily competing in the Red River Athletic Conference (RRAC) since the 2015–16 academic year. The Jaguars previously competed as an NAIA Independent within the Association of Independent Institutions (AII) from the school's athletic program's inception in 2007–08 until 2014–15.

UHV competes in six intercollegiate sports: Men's sports include baseball, golf and soccer; while women's sports include golf, soccer and softball. UHV began its intercollegiate athletic program with baseball and softball in 2007–08, followed by men's & women's golf and men's & women's soccer in 2010–11.

Athletic director
Ashley Walyuchow has served as Director of Athletics since the program's inception in 2006.

Baseball
The Jaguars baseball team won back-to-back Association of Independent Institutions (AII) conference championships (2009 and 2010). The team plays its home games at Riverside Stadium in Victoria, Texas. Head coach Terry Puhl is a former outfielder for the Houston Astros and Kansas City Royals.  Puhl also is a Canadian Baseball Hall of Fame and Texas Baseball Hall of Fame inductee, and served as head coach for the Canadian national baseball team in a win over Cuba at the Olympic qualifier in 2006 and at the 2008 Summer Olympics.

Softball

The Jaguars softball team won the first AII conference championship, finished 11th in the nation in 2009 and was ranked 21st in 2010. The Jaguar softball team won its second AII conference title in May 2013. The Jaguars moved on to the opening round of the NAIA national championship where they were defeated by Lubbock Christian University, finishing the season ranked 18th. The team plays its home games at Victoria's Youth Sports Complex located in Victoria, Texas. The Jaguars are coached by Lindsey Ortiz, former player on the first Jaguars team.

Soccer
The Jaguars men’s and women’s teams began in fall 2010. A soccer field, dubbed “The Cage” by players, was constructed on the UHV campus, and the men’s and women’s teams hosted the first on-campus home games ever during their fall campaign.

The men’s team and women's teams are coached by Adrian Rigby, the teams have seen steady improvement since day one.  The men's team won both 2017 RRAC regular season and tournament championships.

Golf
UHV men’s and women’s golf teams began in fall 2010. The squads practice and host meets at Victoria Country Club and The Club at Colony Creek. Head coach is Christi Cano, former All-American at Oklahoma State University and LPGA tour player.

Notable alumni

 Van G. Garrett, poet

References

External links

 
 Official athletics website

 
Victoria
University of Houston-Victoria
Houston-Victoria
Victoria, Texas
Houston-Victoria
Education in Victoria County, Texas
Buildings and structures in Victoria, Texas
1973 establishments in Texas